Nikolai Johnsen (born 24 August 1988) is a Norwegian who lives and performs in South Korea as a television personality and graduate student in international studies at Korea University.

Career
In the summer of 2015 he first appeared on the television program Non-Summit as the Norwegian representative. On October 7, 2015, Norwegian Seafood Council appointed him as an goodwill ambassador for Norwegian seafood. In 2016, he has served as honorary ambassador for film The Wave.

Filmography

Television series

References

External links

1988 births
Living people
Norwegian television personalities
Norwegian expatriates in South Korea
Norwegian expatriates in Japan